The Swingin'est is an album by American trombonist Bennie Green and saxophonist Gene Ammons recorded in 1958 and released on the Vee-Jay label. The album has also been released under the title Juggin' Around.

Reception

The Allmusic review by Scott Yanow awarded the album 2 stars and stated "The emphasis is on the blues and very basic chord changes on this relaxed jam session... Due to the similarity of the material plus three alternate takes that have been added to augment the original program, it is advisable to listen to this CD in small doses".

Track listing
 "Juggin' Around" (Frank Foster) – 6:31  
 "Going South" (Foster) – 10:44  
 "Jim Dog" (Gene Ammons) – 7:05  
 "Sermonette" (Nat Adderley, Jon Hendricks) – 4:19  
 "A Little Ditty" (Frank Wess) – 4:01  
 "Swingin' for Benny" (Bennie Green) – 12:10 Bonus track on CD reissue   
 "Juggin' Around" [alternate take] (Foster) – 6:47 Bonus track on CD reissue  
 "Jim Dog" [alternate take] (Ammons) – 7:31 Bonus track on CD reissue  
 "Sermonette" (Adderley, Hendricks) – 4:18 Bonus track on CD reissue  
Recorded at Bell Sound Studios, New York City on November 12, 1958.

Personnel
Bennie Green – trombone  
Gene Ammons, Frank Foster – tenor saxophone 
Nat Adderley – cornet
Frank Wess – tenor saxophone, flute
Tommy Flanagan – piano
Eddie Jones – bass
Albert Heath – drums

References 

Vee-Jay Records albums
Bennie Green albums
Gene Ammons albums
1958 albums